Ilie-Constantin Ciotoiu (born 11 July 1995) is a Romanian male weightlifter, competing in the 56 kg category and representing Romania at international competitions. He competed at world championships, including at the 2015 World Weightlifting Championships. At the 2017 European Weightlifting Championships Ciotoiu won 2 bronze medals, at Clean & Jerk and overall ranking.

Major results

References

External links
 
 

1995 births
Living people
Romanian male weightlifters
Place of birth missing (living people)
European Weightlifting Championships medalists
20th-century Romanian people
21st-century Romanian people